Eucalosphaera elegans is a species of sap beetles, insects in the family Nitidulidae. It is found in Perak, Malaysia.

References 

Nitidulidae
Beetles described in 1897